Baron Vivian, of Glynn and of Truro in the County of Cornwall, is a title in the Peerage of the United Kingdom and held by a branch of the Vivian family. It was created on 19 August 1841 for the soldier Sir Hussey Vivian, 1st Baronet. He had already been created a baronet, of Truro in the County of Cornwall, on 19 January 1828. His eldest legitimate son, the second Baron, represented Bodmin in the House of Commons and served as Lord Lieutenant of Cornwall. His son, the third Baron, served as British Ambassador to Italy from 1891 to 1893. The latter's great-grandson, the sixth Baron, was a soldier and a Conservative member of the House of Lords. Lord Vivian was one of the ninety elected hereditary peers that were allowed to remain in the House of Lords after the passing of the House of Lords Act 1999. As of 2014 the titles are held by his only son, the seventh Baron, who succeeded in 2004.

Sir Robert Vivian, illegitimate son of the first Baron, was also a prominent soldier. Another member of the Vivian family was Henry Vivian, 1st Baron Swansea. He was the nephew of the first Baron. Lord Swansea's younger brother was Sir Arthur Vivian.

The traditional residence of the Barons Vivian was Glynn House near Cardinham, Cornwall, purchased and first lived in by the 1st Baron Vivian.

A number of Vivian family graves with Celtic-style headstones can be found at the Parish Church of St Winnow.

Barons Vivian (1841)
(Richard) Hussey Vivian, 1st Baron Vivian (1775–1842)
Charles Crespigny Vivian, 2nd Baron Vivian (1808–1886)
Hussey Crespigny Vivian, 3rd Baron Vivian (1834–1893)
George Crespigny Brabazon Vivian, 4th Baron Vivian (1878–1940)
Anthony Crespigny Claude Vivian, 5th Baron Vivian (1906–1991)
Nicholas Crespigny Lawrence Vivian, 6th Baron Vivian (1935–2004)
Charles Crespigny Hussey Vivian, 7th Baron Vivian (born 1966)

The heir presumptive is the present holder's first cousin, Thomas Crespigny Brabazon Vivian (born 1971).
The heir presumptive's heir presumptive is the present holder's third cousin once removed, (Christopher) John Desmond Vivian (born 1956), a great-great-grandson of the 2nd Baron.
The heir presumptive's heir presumptive's heir apparent is his son, Alastair Desmond Vivian (born 1991).

Male-line family tree

See also

 Vivian family
Baron Swansea

Notes

References

Baronies in the Peerage of the United Kingdom
Noble titles created in 1841
Noble titles created for UK MPs
Baron